Sport Relief 2014 is a fundraising event organised by Sport Relief. A number of run-up events took place and the main event consisted of a live telethon broadcast on BBC One and BBC Two from the evening of Friday 21 March 2014 to early the following morning. Due to the closure of BBC Television Centre, the live studio event is now broadcast from the Queen Elizabeth Olympic Park in London.

Main event
The live telethon was broadcast on BBC One and BBC Two from the evening of Friday 21 March 2014 to early the following morning as well as a number of run-up events and was presented by Gary Lineker, Davina McCall, David Walliams, Claudia Winkleman, Jack Whitehall, Fearne Cotton, Clare Balding and Gabby Logan.

Presenters

Appeal film presenters
Stars including Davina McCall, David Tennant, Alex Jones, Gary Lineker, David Beckham, Little Mix and Kelly Hoppen presented appeal films.

Official single
Little Mix recorded the official single "Word Up!" for this Sport Relief.

Sketches and features

Musical performances

Within other shows
TV programmes that led up to the main event included:
 The Great Comic Relief Bake Off
 Comic Relief Does Glee Club
 Sport Relief's Top Dog
 Famous, Rich and Hungry
 Davina Beyond Breaking Point for Sport Relief
 Pointless Celebrities
 The Sport Relief Games Show
 Alex Against the Rock for Sport Relief

Donation progress

References

Comic Relief
2014 in British television
2014 in British sport
2014
March 2014 events in the United Kingdom